The Wooden Bridge (in Persian: پل چوبی)  is a 2012 Iranian film directed by Mehdi Karampour.

Cast
Mahnaz Afshar as Shirin
Bahram Radan as Amir
Borzoo Arjmand as Siavash
Farhad Aslani as Rabi'
Mehran Modiri as Dr. Sabouhi
Atila Pesyani as Uncle Naser
Omid Rohani as Rahmat Lotfi
Hedieh Tehrani as Nazli

It is about life of a young couple who want to migrate from their country. But the arrival of Nazli makes problems...

References

External links
Film's tralier
The Wooden Bridge in Facebook
The Wooden Bridge in Twitter

Iranian drama films
2012 films
2010s Persian-language films